Margherita Chabran (born 1780?) was an Italian operatic soprano. Her last name is sometimes given as Chabrand or Chambrend, and later as Chabrand-Albani.

Chabran was a pupil of Felice Pellegrini. She passed her career largely in Naples between 1802 and 1820; a principal soprano at the Teatro dei Fiorentini until 1816, in that year she became a principal soprano at the Teatro di San Carlo, where she remained until 1818. On April 24, 1816, she sang Teti in the world premiere of Gioacchino Rossini's cantata Teti e Peleo; on September 26 of the same year she was the first Lisetta in his La gazzetta.

References

Year of death missing
Italian operatic sopranos
19th-century Italian women opera singers
Year of birth uncertain